The House of Councillors (Korean hangul: 참의원, hanja: 參議院) was the upper house of the National Assembly of the Republic of Korea during its Second Republic. The House of Councillors was established by the Constitution of the Second Republic of Korea, which established a bicameral legislature. Officially, a House of Councillors was provided for by the Constitution of the First Republic, but the House of Representatives acted as the only house in a unicameral legislature since the House of Councillors was not actually established.

Leadership

President of the House of Councillors

Vice President of the House of Councillors

See also
National Assembly
House of Representatives

Government of South Korea
History of South Korea
National upper houses
Defunct upper houses
1960 establishments in South Korea
1961 disestablishments in South Korea
Organizations established in 1960
Organizations disestablished in 1961